Morea (Spanish name: Moreda, and officially Morea / Moreda) is one of 18 parishes (administrative divisions) in Aller, a municipality within the province and autonomous community of Asturias, in northern Spain.

Villages
 Les Ferraes
 Campera
 El Caleyu
 La Barraca
 El Campo
 La Viñona
 El Carmen
 San Isidro
 Sotiello
 Tartiere
 Caleyón

References

Parishes in Aller